The 2015 NASCAR K&N Pro Series East is the 29th season of the K&N Pro Series East. It began with the Hart to Heart Breast Cancer Foundation 150 at New Smyrna Speedway on February 15 and ended with the Drive Sober 125 at Dover International Speedway on October 3. Ben Rhodes enters the season as the defending Drivers' Champion. William Byron won the championship, fifteen points in front of Scott Heckert. All of the races in the 2015 season were televised on NBCSN on a tape delay basis.

Drivers

Notes

Schedule
All of the races in the 2015 season will be televised on NBCSN and will be on a tape delay basis.

Notes

Results and standings

Races

Notes
1 – The qualifying session for the UNOH 100 was cancelled due to heavy rain. The starting line-up was decided by championship points.
2 – The qualifying session for the Drive Sober 125 was cancelled due to heavy rain. The starting line-up was decided by championship points.

Drivers' championship

(key) Bold - Pole position awarded by time. Italics - Pole position set by final practice results or rainout. * – Most laps led.

Notes
1 – Travis Miller received championship points, despite the fact that he did not start the race.
2 – Brandon Glover and Eddie Cheever III received championship points, despite the fact that they did not qualify for the race.
3 – Scored points towards the K&N Pro Series West.

See also

2015 NASCAR Sprint Cup Series
2015 NASCAR Xfinity Series
2015 NASCAR Camping World Truck Series
2015 NASCAR K&N Pro Series West
2015 NASCAR Whelen Modified Tour
2015 NASCAR Whelen Southern Modified Tour
2015 NASCAR Canadian Tire Series
2015 NASCAR Mexico Series
2015 NASCAR Whelen Euro Series

References

ARCA Menards Series East